Marcel Möring (born 5 September 1957, in Enschede) is a Dutch writer.  He received the Ferdinand Bordewijk Prijs in 2007 for his novel Dis, translated into English under the title In A Dark Wood.

He received the Anna Blaman Prijs in 1996.

Novels 

 
 
 
 
 
 
 
 Comment ça je dis pas dors, 2009
 C'est toi le business, 2005
 Le rouge c’est chaud, Vacarme 28, Summer 2004 (Prose).
 Niente, Vacarme 26, Winter 2004  (Prose).
 Malécot, éditions contrat maint, 2003,
 Summer is ready when you are, with Françoise Quardon and Jean-Pierre Rehm, éditions joca seria, 2002
 pose-moi une question difficile, éditions rup&rud, 2002, 
 Arrête maintenant, éditions l’Attente, 2001
 Je veux être physique, Farrago, 2000, 
 A series of storyless playlets: "Va Cherche les mots mais comment les trouver" is, for example, a reflection on poetry.
 La réalité en face/la quoi ?, Al Dante/RROZ, 1999. (in collaboration with Anne Portugal)

References
Profile at the Digital library for Dutch literature

1957 births
Living people
21st-century Dutch novelists
Dutch male novelists
People from Enschede
Ferdinand Bordewijk Prize winners
21st-century Dutch male writers